is a Japanese football player.

Club career
In 2013 Kai Hirano moved from Kataller Toyama to Buriram United in Thai Premier League. In October, he scored his first goal for Buriram United against Ratchaburi FC. In the next game he scored his second goal for Buriram against Pattaya United FC, which was his first home goal.

Honours
Buriram United
Thai Premier League : 2013
Thai FA Cup : 2013
Thai League Cup : 2013
Kor Royal Cup : 2013, 2014

References

External links

1987 births
Living people
Biwako Seikei Sport College alumni
Association football people from Shimane Prefecture
Japanese footballers
J1 League players
J2 League players
Kai Hirano
Kataller Toyama players
Kai Hirano
Cerezo Osaka players
Kai Hirano
Japanese expatriate footballers
Expatriate footballers in Thailand
Japanese expatriate sportspeople in Thailand
Association football wingers